Utthara Nayar is a cancer researcher based in Boston, Massachusetts. Her work focuses specifically on breast cancer.

Biography 
Nayar lived in the country of Oman during her childhood. She was encouraged to participate in science, with her passion being in biology and physics.

For her undergraduate degree Nayar attended the University of Wisconsin-Madison as a part of their biology Honors Program with a major in biology. She earned her doctorate through Weill Cornell Medical College. She is employed at Dana-Farber Cancer Institute as a researcher in the lab of Nikhil Wagle. She is also a member of a team at Harvard Medical School as a research affiliate.

Research 
At the Dana-Farber Cancer Institute, Nayar and her team have been investigating metastatic breast cancer and how hormones affect patient treatment. For some forms of breast cancer a patient is ER positive, or estrogen receptor positive, meaning that tumors grow as the levels of estrogen in the body increase. For this type of breast cancer, patients quickly become resistant to the treatment methods available and their bodies stop responding to any medical help they receive, seemingly without any connection. However, Nayar and her team found a link in patients who became resistant to ER positive treatment- many had HER-2 gene mutations. This possible discovery has spurred on a five-year phase 2 trial by Nayar and her team, investigating the connection between ER positive treatment rejection and the HER-2 gene.

Publications

Awards and recognition 
In 2012 while at Cornell, Nayar was awarded the AACR-Aflac, Inc. Scholar-in-Training Award.

In 2018 while working at the Dana-Farber Cancer Institute, Nayar was awarded the 2018 Women In Cancer Research Scholar Award by the American Association for Cancer Research for her work with breast cancer.

References

Year of birth missing (living people)
Living people
Cancer researchers
University of Wisconsin–Madison College of Letters and Science alumni
Weill Cornell Medical College alumni
Harvard Medical School people
American women biologists
21st-century American women